Kang Tae-sik (Korean: 강태식; born March 15, 1963 South Korea) is a South Korean former footballer who played as a defender.

He started his professional career at POSCO Atoms in 1986, and was named to the K League Best XI team in 1988.

References

External links 
 

1963 births
Living people
Association football midfielders
Pohang Steelers players
South Korean footballers
Hanyang University alumni